Meenakshi College for Women is a women's college in Kodambakkam, Chennai, Tamil Nadu, India. The college is affiliated to University of Madras. Courses offered include B.Sc. (Bachelor of Science), M.Sc. (Master of Science) and B.Com.

Courses offered

Undergraduate courses

 B.A. - History
 B.A. - Economics
 B.A. - English Literature
 B.Sc. - Mathematics
 B.Sc. - Physics
 B.Sc. - Chemistry
 B.Sc. - Plant Biology and Bio-technology
 B.Sc. - Advanced Zoology and Bio-technology
 B.Com. (CS) - Corporate Secretaryship
 B.Com. - General
 B.Com. (BM) - Banking Management
 B.Com. (CA) - Computer application

Postgraduate courses
 M.Com.
 M.A. - History
 M.A. - Economics
 M.A. - Public Administration
 M.A. - Tamil
 M.Sc. - Mathematics
 M.Sc. - Physics
 M.Sc. - Bio-chemistry
 M.Sc. - Information Technology
 M.C.A. - Master of Computer Application
 M.B.A - Master of Business Administration

Research programme
 M.Phil. (Tamil, Mathematics, History, Economics, Physics, Computer Science, Commerce)
 Ph.D. (Tamil, Economics, History)

Facilities
 Laboratory
 Library
 Computer Facilities
 Playground
 Canteen

References

Women's universities and colleges in Chennai
Arts and Science colleges in Chennai
Colleges affiliated to University of Madras
Educational institutions established in 1975
1975 establishments in Tamil Nadu